Japan first participated in the Little League World Series in 1962.  Between 1962 and 2000, Japan participated in the Far East Region of the LLWS. In 2001, the Far East Region was divided into the Asia Region and the Pacific Region. From 2001 to 2006, Japan competed in the Asia Region. In 2007, the Japan Region was created, so that the winner of the Japanese championship receives an automatic berth in the Series.

Japan Championships
In 1967, the first All-Japan championship took place.  Prior to 1967, Japanese teams participated in the Far East region in each year between 1962 and 1966. In 1969, the Far East Region conducted its first regional tournament, with teams from six nations.

Summary
As of the 2022 Little League World Series.

See also
Baseball awards#World
Asia-Pacific Region in each Little League division
Little League
Far East Region (1962–2000)
Asia Region (2001–2006)
Pacific Region (2001–2006)
Asia–Pacific Region (2007–2012) (Japan Region created in 2007)
Asia–Pacific & Middle East Region (2013–) (Australia Region created in 2013)
Intermediate League
Junior League
Senior League
Big League

References

External links
 Official Site in Japanese
 Japanese Region Tournament Results

Japan
Baseball competitions in Japan
Recurring sporting events established in 2007